Vlade is a given name. Notable people with this name include:

 Vlade Divac (born 1968), Serbian basketball player and executive
 Vlade Đurović (born 1948), Serbian basketball coach
 Vlade Janakievski (born 1957), American football player
 Vladeta Jerotić (1924–2018), Serbian psychiatrist, psychotherapist, philosopher and writer
 Vlade Lazarevski (born 1983),  Macedonian footballer

See also 
 Vlada, given name

Macedonian masculine given names
Serbian masculine given names